George Brant Little (4 December 1906 – 27 June 1980) was a Canadian middle-distance runner. He competed in the men's 800 metres at the 1928 Summer Olympics.

References

1906 births
1980 deaths
Athletes (track and field) at the 1928 Summer Olympics
Canadian male middle-distance runners
Olympic track and field athletes of Canada
Athletes (track and field) at the 1930 British Empire Games
Commonwealth Games competitors for Canada
People from Boissevain, Manitoba
Sportspeople from Manitoba